The Seattle Thunder are a women's American football team in the Extreme Football League (X League) based in Kent, Washington, in the Seattle metropolitan area.

History
The Extreme Football League (X League) was announced in December 2019, as a successor to the Legends Football League (LFL). The announcement included the Thunder, a successor to the LFL's Seattle Mist. The X League's 2020 season was postponed, and the league also did not operate during 2021, amid the COVID-19 pandemic.

The Thunder first competed during the 2022 X League season, defeating the Denver Rush and losing to the Chicago Blitz during the regular season. The Thunder advanced to the X League's postseason, where they again faced Chicago and lost by a single point, 34–33, ending their season.

References

External links
 

Legends Football League US teams
American football in Seattle
American football teams in Washington (state)
Women's sports in Washington (state)
2022 establishments in Washington (state)
American football teams established in 2022